Mr B's Emporium of Reading Delights is an independent bookshop in Bath, Somerset. It was founded by former lawyer and derivatives trader Nic Bottomley. In 2009, it was the official bookseller of the Bath Literary Festival. In 2011, it won the Bookseller's Award for Independent Bookshop of the Year, which it had won previously in 2008.

The shop has a resident band which play at author signings and other events.

References

Bookshops of England
Buildings and structures in Bath, Somerset
Culture in Bath, Somerset